Mazarea Dina FC is an Egyptian football club based in Cairo. It was founded under the name Ittihad Othman, and was changed to the current name in 1998.

Best achievements
 Egyptian League Cup
2000 – Runner-up

Managers
 Ahmed Rifaat (1998–2001)
 Hassan Shehata (2001–2001)
 Amro El-Faowal (2013)

References

Football clubs in Egypt